Topo & Roby was a 1980s Italian Italo disco duo consisting of Roby, the stage name of American-Italian vocalist Simona Zanini, and Topo, a robot. Zanini sang all vocal parts, including the automated voice of Topo, and the music was written, performed and produced by keyboardist Aldo Martinelli and producer Fabrizio Gatto.

Topo & Roby are mostly remembered, apart from their unusual line-up, for the song "Under the Ice" (1984), who enjoyed significant airplay in European disco clubs and radio stations and reached number 20 in France.

Discography

Singles

See also 
 Martinelli (band)
 Radiorama
 Raggio Di Luna (Moon Ray)

References

External links 
 

Italo disco groups
Italian pop music groups
Musical groups from Milan
Italian musical duos